The grey rhebok or gray rhebuck (Pelea capreolus), locally known as the reebok  in Afrikaans, is a species of antelope native to South Africa, Lesotho, and Eswatini (Swaziland). The specific name capreolus is Latin for 'little goat'.

Description

The grey rhebok is a medium-sized antelope weighing  with a long neck and narrow ears. The coat is short and dense and coloured in various shades of grey.

Distribution and habitat
They are not strictly limited to this habitat as they can be found in the coastal belt of the Cape, almost at sea level.

Reproduction and behaviour
The grey rhebok is territorial and maintains its territory by urinating and defecating, standing or walking in an upright posture, and patrolling. Males become extremely aggressive during the breeding season. The grey rhebok usually aggregates in herds of one to 15 females and young and one mature male. This species is therefore polygynous. The grey rhebok is a seasonal breeder.

This species is a browser, and gets most of its water from the food it eats, so it can utilize food sources a long distance from standing water.

Conservation status
The grey rhebok is listed as Near Threatened.

In contemporary culture
The Afrikaans spelling of the species, reebok, lends its name to the British-American sportswear manufacturing company Reebok. In 1958, Reebok founder Joseph William Foster found the name in US Webster’s New School and Office Dictionary.

References

External links
 
 

antelopes of Sub-Saharan Africa
Bovidae
grey rhebok
mammals of Eswatini
mammals of Lesotho
mammals of South Africa
mammals of Southern Africa